Rodrigo Dosma was a Spanish humanist from Badajoz, active during the late 16th-century and early 17th-century. He authored works such as De authoritate Sacrae. Scripturae. Libri III in 1594 and Expositio, sive Paraphrasis in sacros centum quinquaginta Psalmos in 1601.

References

Spanish Renaissance humanists
16th-century Spanish people
17th-century Spanish people
People from Badajoz
University of Salamanca alumni